Apinan Kaewpila (born 31 March 1985 – 21 June 2020) was a Thai professional footballer, who played as a defender.

References

External links
 Goal.com
 

1985 births
2020 deaths
Apinan Kaewpila
Apinan Kaewpila
Apinan Kaewpila
Association football defenders
Apinan Kaewpila
Apinan Kaewpila
Apinan Kaewpila
Apinan Kaewpila
Apinan Kaewpila
Apinan Kaewpila
Apinan Kaewpila